The Orosí Volcano, in Spanish the , is an inactive volcano in Costa Rica, situated in the Cordillera de Guanacaste near the border with Nicaragua. The area around the volcano is a popular tourist destination, especially for more ecologically minded tourists due to its biodiversity, including the Guanacaste National Park.

Volcán Orosí itself has a conical shape as viewed from the north or west, but its flanks are heavily eroded. The complex includes Orosí, Orosilito, Volcán Pedregal, and Cacao. The highest peak of the volcanic complex is 1659-m-high Volcán Cacao, 5.5 km SE of Orosí.  Historical eruptions were reported from Orosí in 1844 and 1849, but even at the time of the first volcanological observations at the end of the 19th century, Orosí was overgrown with large trees, and the eruptions may actually have been from neighboring Rincón de la Vieja.

At the base of the volcano is the Maritza Biological Station, which researches aquatic biology, founded in conjunction with Stroud Water Research Center, Avondale, Pennsylvania, USA.

References 

Stratovolcanoes of Costa Rica
Mountains of Costa Rica
Inactive volcanoes